Wayne A. Grudem (born 1948) is a New Testament scholar turned theologian, seminary professor, and author. He co-founded the Council on Biblical Manhood and Womanhood and served as the general editor of the ESV Study Bible.

Life
Grudem was born on February 11, 1948, in Jim Falls, Wisconsin. As a child, he attended First Baptist Church in Eau Claire, Wisconsin. He holds a BA in economics from Harvard University, an MDiv and D.D. from Westminster Theological Seminary, and a PhD in New Testament studies from the University of Cambridge.  In 2001, Grudem became Research Professor of Theology and Biblical Studies  at Phoenix Seminary. Prior to that, he had taught for 20 years at Trinity Evangelical Divinity School, where he was chairman of the department of biblical and systematic theology.

Grudem served on the committee overseeing the English Standard Version translation of the Bible, and from 2005 to 2008 he served as general editor for the 2.1-million-word ESV Study Bible (which was named "2009 Christian Book of the Year" by the Evangelical Christian Publishers Association). In 1999 he was the president of the Evangelical Theological Society. Grudem announced having been diagnosed with Parkinson's Disease on December 22, 2015.

On July 28, 2016, Grudem published an opinion piece on Townhall called "Why Voting for Donald Trump Is a Morally Good Choice". On October 9, the piece was retracted and replaced with one entitled "Trump's Moral Character and the Election". On October 19, the original piece was reinstated and another piece was published, entitled "If You Don't Like Either Candidate, Then Vote for Trump's Policies". Grudem endorsed Trump for re-election in 2020.

In 2018, a Festschrift was published in his honor. Scripture and the People of God: Essays in Honor of Wayne Grudem included contributions from John M. Frame, R. Kent Hughes, Ray Ortlund, John Piper, Vern Poythress, Leland Ryken, Thomas R. Schreiner, and Bruce A. Ware.

Theology
He is the author of multiple books, including Systematic Theology: An Introduction to Biblical Doctrine, which advocates a Calvinistic soteriology, the verbal plenary inspiration and inerrancy of the Bible, believer’s baptism, a plural-elder form of church government, and the complementarian view of gender relationships.  Systematic Theology is a highly influential theology textbook that has sold hundreds of thousands of copies. Grudem holds to noncessationist  beliefs and was at one time a qualified supporter of the Vineyard Movement. 

Grudem and Bruce A. Ware were at the center of Trinitarian debate in 2016 that began online and culminated in print publications. Both Grudem and Ware subscribe to a view of the Trinity called "eternal relations of submission and authority" or "eternal functional subordination" which claims that the Son is eternally submissive to the Father. Their view was challenged by some scholars that the Son only submits to the Father in the incarnation according to his human nature.

Grudem is also a co-founder and past president of the Council on Biblical Manhood and Womanhood. He also edited Recovering Biblical Manhood and Womanhood, Christianity Today'''s "Book of the Year" in 1992, with John Piper.

All of Grudem's research on gender-related issues is now contained in his major 2012 reference work, Evangelical Feminism and Biblical Truth: An Analysis of More Than One Hundred Disputed Questions.

Grudem's view of gender claims that according to Bible, men and women are equal in nature and dignity but operate within a hierarchy in which the husband is the head of the wife.

Works

In recent years, Grudem's publications have focused on the application of the ethical teachings of the Bible to broader areas of the culture including government and economics.

Books
 
 
 
 
   A condensed version of Systematic Theology.
 
 
 .  Second edition Crossway, 2012.
 
   Revised and condensed edition of Bible Doctrine.
 
  
 
 
   Condensed extract from Politics — According to the Bible.
   Condensed extract from Politics — According to the Bible 
 
 
 
 

As editor
 
 
 
 
 

Articles and chapters
 
 
 

Video courses
 Christian Beliefs DVD Discipleship CourseJournals
 Biblical Foundations for Manhood and Womanhood'' (editor)

References

External links
 

1948 births
20th-century Calvinist and Reformed theologians
21st-century Calvinist and Reformed theologians
Alumni of the University of Cambridge
American Calvinist and Reformed theologians
American Charismatics
American evangelicals
Christian Old Earth creationists
Harvard College alumni
Living people
Members of the Evangelical Free Church of America
People from Chippewa Falls, Wisconsin
Systematic theologians
Trinity International University faculty
Westminster Theological Seminary alumni